Mahsa or Mahsā is a feminine given name of Persian origin. It is also a name commonly used for the following:

Name 
 Mahsa (name)

Mahsa Amini-related 
 Deaths during the Mahsa Amini protests
 Death sentences during the Mahsa Amini protests
 Detainees of the Mahsa Amini protests
 Timeline of the Mahsa Amini protests

Other uses 
 MAHSA University, medical university in Petaling Jaya, Malaysia

See also 
 Mahsas (disambiguation)